The canton of Verneuil-sur-Seine is an administrative division of the Yvelines department, northern France. It was created at the French canton reorganisation which came into effect in March 2015. Its seat is in Verneuil-sur-Seine.

It consists of the following communes:
 
Les Alluets-le-Roi
Crespières
Davron
Feucherolles
Médan
Morainvilliers
Noisy-le-Roi
Orgeval
Saint-Nom-la-Bretèche
Triel-sur-Seine
Verneuil-sur-Seine
Vernouillet
Villennes-sur-Seine

References

Cantons of Yvelines